Onobops is a genus of very small aquatic snails, operculate gastropod mollusks in the family Cochliopidae or in the Hydrobiidae.

Species
Species within the genus Onobops include:

 † Onobops bispiralis Wesselingh, Anderson & Kadolsky, 2006 - from Middle Miocene to early Late Miocene of the Pebas Formation
 † Onobops? bisulcatus Wesselingh, Anderson & Kadolsky, 2006 - from late Early Miocene to Middle Miocene of the Pebas Formation
 † Onobops communis Wesselingh, Anderson & Kadolsky, 2006 - from Middle Miocene to early Late Miocene of the Pebas Formation
 Onobops crassus F. G. Thompson, 1968 - type species
 † Onobops elongoides Wesselingh, Anderson & Kadolsky, 2006 - from late Early Miocene to Middle Miocene of the Pebas Formation
 † Onobops? erectus Wesselingh, Anderson & Kadolsky, 2006 - from Middle Miocene to early Late Miocene of the Pebas Formation
 † Onobops? iquitensis Wesselingh, Anderson & Kadolsky, 2006 - from Middle Miocene of the Pebas Formation
 Onobops jacksoni (Bartsch, 1953)
 † Onobops microconvexus Wesselingh, Anderson & Kadolsky, 2006 - from late Middle Miocene to early Middle Miocene of the Pebas Formation
 † Onobops minissimus Wesselingh, Anderson & Kadolsky, 2006 - from late Miocene to early Late Miocene of the Pebas Formation
 † Onobops ventricosus Wesselingh, Anderson & Kadolsky, 2006 - from Middle Miocene to early Late Miocene of the Pebas Formation

References

Cochliopidae
Hydrobiidae